Tom Gill (26 July 1916 – 22 July 1971) was a British actor who was born in Newcastle upon Tyne, Northumberland, England. He made his stage debut in 1935, and his theatre work included the original production of Noël Coward's After the Ball at the Globe Theatre in 1954.

Selected filmography
 Midshipman Easy (1935)
 The High Command (1937)
 Meet Mr. Penny (1938)
 Trunk Crime (1939)
 Something in the City (1950)
 Mister Drake's Duck (1951)
 The Happy Family (1952)
 Love in Pawn (1953)
 The Limping Man (1953)
 Jumping for Joy (1956)
 Fun at St. Fanny's (1956)
 Behind the Headlines (1956)
 Carry On Admiral (1957)
 After the Ball (1957)
 Up the Creek (1958)
 Blind Spot (1958)
 Further Up the Creek (1958)
 The Navy Lark (1959)
 Carry On Constable (1960)
The Fourth Square (1961)
 Smokescreen (1964)
 The Night Caller (1965)
 The Mini-Affair (1967) - Salesman

References

External links

1916 births
1971 deaths
English male stage actors
English male film actors
English male television actors
Male actors from Newcastle upon Tyne
20th-century English male actors